The 2004 Pendle Borough Council election took place on 10 June 2004 to elect members of Pendle Borough Council in Lancashire, England. One third of the council was up for election and the Liberal Democrats gained overall control of the council from no overall control.

After the election, the composition of the council was
Liberal Democrat 30
Conservative 11
Labour 8

Campaign
Before the election the Liberal Democrats were the largest party on the council with 24 seats, but without a majority as there were 13 Labour, 11 Conservative and 1 independent councillors. The election had 16 seats being contested by a total of 58 candidates. Both the Labour and Conservative parties contested every seat, while the Liberal Democrats had candidates in 15 seats. The other candidates were 8 from the British National Party, 2 independents and 1 from the United Kingdom Independence Party. 12 sitting councillors defended their seats, with a further 2, Judith Robinson and Fred Hartley, contesting different wards to the ones they held. Several previous councillors also attempted to win back seats on the council including Lord Tony Greaves for the Liberal Democrats.

The election was held under all postal voting and took place at the same time as the 2004 European election.

Election result
The results saw the Liberal Democrats win a majority on the council, after gaining 5 seats from Labour and 1 from an independent. The Liberal Democrats took 11 of the 16 seats contested, with gains in Nelson which previously had been a strongly Labour area, to hold 30 of the 49 seats on the council. Labour losses included 3 sitting councillors in the wards of Brierfield, Clover Hill and Whitefield, and the party dropped to fourth place in other wards.

Meanwhile, the Conservatives held the seats they had been defending and came within 8 votes of defeating the Liberal Democrat leader of the council Alan Davies. No other group won any seats, but the British National Party, standing in half of the wards, won 10% of the vote and came second in some seats.

Following the election the Liberal Democrats took all 10 seats on the council executive.

Ward results

References

2004 English local elections
2004
2000s in Lancashire